Thạnh Hưng may refer to several places in Vietnam:

:vi:Thạnh Hưng, Kiến Tường, a rural commune of Kiến Tường, Long An Province
:vi:Thạnh Hưng, Giồng Riềng, a rural commune of Giồng Riềng District
:vi:Thạnh Hưng, Tân Hưng, a rural commune of Tân Hưng District, Long An Province
Former name of Lấp Vò District: Thạnh Hưng District

See also
Thanh Hưng, a rural commune of Điện Biên District